Events from the 1250s in the Kingdom of Scotland.

Monarch 

 Alexander III, 1249–1286

Events 

 1251 – Margaret of England and Alexander III of Scotland are married, as stipulated by the Treaty of Newcastle, signed in 1244.

Births

Deaths 
 19 March 1250 - Clement of Dunblane, bishop and Guardian of Scotland
 13 June 1250 – Donnchadh, Earl of Carrick
Full date unknown
 1250 – Maol Domhnaich, Earl of Lennox
 c. 1250 – Fearchar, Earl of Ross
 1251 – Walter Byset, Lord of Aboyne
 c. 1256 – Gilbert, Earl of Orkney (born c. 1210)
 1258 – Walter Comyn, Lord of Badenoch
 1258 – William de Bondington

See also 

 List of years in Scotland
 Timeline of Scottish history

References 

1250s